Maple Grove is the name of some places in the U.S. state of Wisconsin:
Maple Grove, Barron County, Wisconsin, a town
Maple Grove, Manitowoc County, Wisconsin, a town
Maple Grove (community), Wisconsin, in Manitowoc County, an unincorporated community
Maple Grove, Shawano County, Wisconsin, a town